Zeta Pavonis, Latinized from ζ Pavonis, is an orange-hued star in the southern constellation Pavo. Its apparent magnitude is 4.01, which is bright enough to be faintly visible to the naked eye. It is moving closer to the Sun with a radial velocity of −16.30. Based upon its motion through space, this star appears to be a member of the Hyades Supercluster.

This is an evolved K-type giant star with a stellar classification of K0 III, which indicates it has exhausted the supply of hydrogen at its core. At the estimated distance of this star, this yields a physical size of about 19 times the radius of the Sun. The star is radiating 155 times the Sun's luminosity.

Zeta Pavonis has a companion, probably optical, of apparent magnitude 12.0 at about 55.6" separation.

References

K-type giants
Hyades Stream
Pavo (constellation)
Pavonis, Zeta
Durchmusterung objects
171759
091792
6982